Alexandre Barbera-Ivanoff is a French artist born in  Paris, France, in 1973.

Biography 
Alexandre Barbera-Ivanoff studied painting from the age of 12 in private workshop, with the painters Christian Welter,  Gerard Di-Maccio, then Jean Bertholle.

The compulsory military service gave him a unique experiment: Painter in the Earth Army.

He carried out with success frescoes, in particular in the Palace of King Mohammed VI in Marrakech (Morocco).

On September 9, 2005 in Saint-Malo, France, Alexandre Barberà-Ivanoff made public his Proclamation on Essentialisme Artistique.

He realised portraits of characters as corsairs, for example this one of Jean-Marie Le Pen, in 2006.

His main work was exposed in June 2010, in the European Parliament of Strasbourg.

Spring 2015, Barbera-Ivanoff participated, in Italy and with 4 other European painters, in the elaboration of the 25 paintings which are permanently exhibited in the center city of Cosenza. These 25 large panels (2 x 3 meters) represent the different periods of the history of the city. museocentrostorico 

Alexandre Barbera-Ivanoff is grandson and expert of the Russian painter Serge Ivanoff.

Illustrated books 

 Angenard Capitaine de corsaire, 
 Athanase Postel Corsaire et aventurier, 
 Flibustiers aux Antilles, 
 La vida de los piratas, 
 Mes décadanses, Jean-Paul Chayrigues de Olmetta, 
 Pirati. Avventure, scontri e razzie nel Mediterraneo del XVII secolo

References 
 Barbera-Ivanoff, face cachée - 2007 -

External links 
 Website of Alexandre Barbera-Ivanoff

Works 

20th-century French painters
20th-century French male artists
21st-century French male artists
French male painters
21st-century French painters
1973 births
Living people
Jean-Marie Le Pen